Capsulia is a genus of East Asian dwarf spiders that was first described by Michael I. Saaristo, L. H. Tu & S. Q. Li in 2006.  it contains only two species, both found in China: C. laciniosa and C. tianmushana.

See also
 List of Linyphiidae species

References

Araneomorphae genera
Linyphiidae
Spiders of China
Taxa named by Michael Saaristo